The 2009 WNBA season was the 13th season and final season for the Sacramento Monarchs of the Women's National Basketball Association. The Monarchs failed to qualify for the WNBA Playoffs for the first time in seven years. The Monarchs would later discontinue operations just 2 months after the 2009 season ended.

Offseason

Dispersal Draft
Based on the Monarchs' 2008 record, they would pick 7th in the Houston Comets dispersal draft. The Monarchs picked Ranae Camino.

WNBA Draft
The following are the Monarchs' selections in the 2009 WNBA Draft.

Transactions
September 9: The Monarchs signed Chelsea Newton and waived Lisa Willis.
August 28: The Monarchs signed Lisa Willis to a seven-day contract.
August 17: The Monarchs acquired Kristin Haynie from the Detroit Shock in exchange for Crystal Kelly.
August 7: The Monarchs signed Whitney Boddie to a seven-day contract and waived Chelsea Newton.
June 5: The Monarchs waived Miao Lijie.
June 4: The Monarchs waived Charel Allen, Whitney Boddie, and Morgan Warburton.
May 25: The Monarchs waived Barbara Farris.
March 20: The Monarchs traded A’Quonesia Franklin and Kim Smith to the Phoenix Mercury in exchange for Barbara Farris.
February 10: The Monarchs signed Hamchétou Maïga-Ba.
January 20: The Monarchs re-signed free agent Ticha Penicheiro.
January 14: The Monarchs re-signed free agent DeMya Walker and signed Chelsea Newton and Miao Li Jie to training camp contracts.

Free agents

Additions

Subtractions

Roster

Season standings

Schedule

Preseason

|- align="center" bgcolor="ffbbbb"
| 1 || May 21 || 10:00pm || @ Seattle || 55-64 || Powell (15) || Maiga-Ba, Paris, Harper (5) || 6 players (1) || KeyArena  4,875 || 0-1
|- align="center" bgcolor="ffbbbb"
| 2 || May 27 || 2:00pm || Phoenix || 74-70 || Harper (11) || Harper (9) || Penicheiro (3) || ARCO Arena  6,339 || 0-2
|-

Regular season

|- align="center" bgcolor="ffbbbb"
| 1 || June 6 || 4:00pm || Seattle ||  || 61-71 || Harper, Penicheiro (11) || Harper (6) || Harper (3) || ARCO Arena  14,824 || 0-1
|- align="center" bgcolor="ffbbbb"
| 2 || June 7 || 9:00pm || @ Seattle || FSN-NW || 70-80 || Lawson (17) || Lawson, Powell (7) || Penicheiro, Newton (3) || KeyArena  9,686 || 0-2
|- align="center" bgcolor="bbffbb"
| 3 || June 12 || 10:00pm || Phoenix ||  || 90-71 || Powell (19) || Harper (8) || Lawson (4) || ARCO Arena  6,438 || 1-2
|- align="center" bgcolor="ffbbbb"
| 4 || June 13 || 10:00pm || @ Phoenix ||  || 104-115 (OT) || Powell (28) || Powell (9) || Lawson (8) || US Airways Center  7,173 || 1-3
|- align="center" bgcolor="ffbbbb"
| 5 || June 16 || 10:00pm || Minnesota ||  || 83-86 || Powell (19) || Harper (9) || Lawson (4) || ARCO Arena  7,736 || 1-4
|- align="center" bgcolor="ffbbbb"
| 6 || June 21 || 10:30pm || @ Los Angeles || NBA TVFSNW || 47-67 || Powell (13) || Walker (9) || Newton (3) || STAPLES Center  9,494 || 1-5
|- align="center" bgcolor="ffbbbb"
| 7 || June 26 || 8:00pm || @ San Antonio ||  || 52-62 || Walker (12) || Walker (8) || Walker (3) || AT&T Center  7,973 || 1-6
|- align="center" bgcolor="ffbbbb"
| 8 || June 28 || 6:00pm || @ Detroit ||  || 72-86 || Brunson (16) || Brunson (7) || Penicheiro (5) || Palace of Auburn Hills  7,277 || 1-7
|- align="center" bgcolor="ffbbbb"
| 9 || June 30 || 8:00pm || @ Chicago ||  || 72-74 || Powell (21) || Powell (8) || Harper, Maiga-Ba, Newton, Penicheiro (2) || UIC Pavilion  2,721 || 1-8
|-

|- align="center" bgcolor="bbffbb"
| 10 || July 2 || 8:00pm || @ Minnesota || NBA TVFSN-N || 74-68 || Powell (21) || Brunson (8) || Penicheiro (4) || Target Center  6,920 || 2-8
|- align="center" bgcolor="bbffbb"
| 11 || July 7 || 10:00pm || Chicago ||  || 83-73 || Lawson, Maiga-Ba (13) || Brunson (10) || Lawson, Penicheiro (6) || ARCO Arena  5,672 || 3-8
|- align="center" bgcolor="ffbbbb"
| 12 || July 9 || 9:00pm || @ Seattle || ESPN2 || 55-66 || Brunson, Robinson (10) || Powell (8) || Penicheiro (3) || KeyArena  6,838 || 3-9
|- align="center" bgcolor="ffbbbb"
| 13 || July 11 || 10:00pm || Phoenix ||  || 105-107 || Powell (23) || Brunson, Walker (8) || Lawson (5) || ARCO Arena  7,798 || 3-10
|- align="center" bgcolor="ffbbbb"
| 14 || July 15 || 3:30pm || @ Phoenix || NBA TVFSNA || 81-100 || Powell (23) || Paris (9) || Penicheiro (6) || US Airways Center  11,590 || 3-11
|- align="center" bgcolor="ffbbbb"
| 15 || July 17 || 10:00pm || Seattle ||  || 56-69 || Powell (13) || Powell (4) || Penicheiro (5) || ARCO Arena  6,386 || 3-12
|- align="center" bgcolor="ffbbbb"
| 16 || July 19 || 9:00pm|| Detroit ||  || 65-69 || Powell (12) || Paris (5) || Paris (3) || ARCO Arena  7,538 || 3-13
|- align="center" bgcolor="ffbbbb"
| 17 || July 22 || 7:00pm || @ Connecticut ||  || 75-83 || Powell (18) || Harper (11) || Penicheiro (4) || Mohegan Sun Arena  5,675 || 3-14
|- align="center" bgcolor="bbffbb"
| 18 || July 23 || 7:30pm || @ New York || MSG || 88-73 || Powell (32) || Powell, Walker (9) || Penicheiro (9) || Madison Square Garden  8,845 || 4-14
|- align="center" bgcolor="ffbbbb"
| 19 || July 26 || 4:00pm || @ Washington ||  || 73-87 || Lawson (16) || Walker (6) || Penicheiro, Walker (4) || Verizon Center  10,757 || 4-15
|- align="center" bgcolor="bbffbb"
| 20 || July 30 || 2:30pm || San Antonio ||  || 101-93 (OT) || Powell (21) || Powell (7) || Penicheiro (9) || ARCO Arena  10,461 || 5-15
|-

|- align="center" bgcolor="ffbbbb"
| 21 || August 1 || 10:00pm || Los Angeles ||  || 56-59 || Powell (18) || Paris, Penicheiro, Powell (5) || Penicheiro (8) || ARCO Arena  7,204 || 5-16
|- align="center" bgcolor="ffbbbb"
| 22 || August 7 || 10:00pm || New York ||  || 66-84 || Paris (19) || Brunson (7) || Penicheiro (4) || ARCO Arena  6,284 || 5-17
|- align="center" bgcolor="bbffbb"
| 23 || August 11 || 8:00pm || @ San Antonio ||  || 90-73 || Brunson (19) || Brunson (9) || Penicheiro (11) || AT&T Center  4,961 || 6-17
|- align="center" bgcolor="bbffbb"
| 24 || August 14 || 10:30pm || @ Los Angeles ||  || 85-79 || Powell (19) || Powell (7) || Penicheiro (10) || STAPLES Center  10,122 || 7-17
|- align="center" bgcolor="ffbbbb"
| 25 || August 15 || 10:00pm || Los Angeles ||  || 61-78 || Powell (20) || Brunson (11) || Lawson, Walker (5) || ARCO Arena  7,646 || 7-18
|- align="center" bgcolor="bbffbb"
| 26 || August 20 || 10:00pm || Indiana ||  || 67-62 || Brunson (16) || Brunson, Powell (10) || Penicheiro (6) || ARCO Arena  6,290 || 8-18
|- align="center" bgcolor="bbffbb"
| 27 || August 22 || 10:00pm || Washington ||  || 82-60 || Powell (26) || Powell (11) || Penicheiro (5) || ARCO Arena  7,067 || 9-18
|- align="center" bgcolor="ffbbbb"
| 28 || August 25 || 7:30pm || @ Atlanta ||  || 83-103 || Brunson (15) || Brunson (7) || Penicheiro (11) || Philips Arena  5,159 || 9-19
|- align="center" bgcolor="ffbbbb"
| 29 || August 28 || 8:00pm || @ Minnesota ||  || 95-100 || Maiga-Ba (20) || Brunson (9) || Powell (6) || Target Center  8,782 || 9-20
|- align="center" bgcolor="bbffbb"
| 30 || August 29 || 7:00pm || @ Indiana ||  || 79-78 || Powell (19) || Powell (11) || Powell (4) || Conseco Fieldhouse  8,579 || 10-20
|-

|- align="center" bgcolor="bbffbb"
| 31 || September 1 || 10:00pm || Connecticut ||  || 90-70 || Brunson (32) || Brunson (13) || Powell (7) || ARCO Arena  6,015 || 11-20
|- align="center" bgcolor="ffbbbb"
| 32 || September 4 || 10:00pm || Atlanta ||  || 90-98 || Powell (23) || Brunson (7) || Penicheiro (7) || ARCO Arena  6,517 || 11-21
|- align="center" bgcolor="ffbbbb"
| 33 || September 10 || 10:00pm || San Antonio || || 71-80 || Powell (17) || Powell (10) || Penicheiro (5) || ARCO Arena  7,566 || 11-22
|- align="center" bgcolor="bbffbb"
| 34 || September 13 || 9:00pm || Minnesota ||  || 88-68 || Powell (27) || Paris (14) || Penicheiro (10) || ARCO Arena  10,212 || 12-22
|-

| All games are viewable on WNBA LiveAccess

Regular Season Statistics

Player Statistics

Team Statistics

Awards and honors
Nicole Powell was named to the 2009 WNBA All-Star Team as a Western Conference injury replacement for Lisa Leslie.
Kara Lawson was awarded the Kim Perrot Sportsmanship Award.

References

External links

Sacramento Monarchs seasons
Sacramento
Sacramento Monarchs